Ali Saeed Karim Ali Abdulla (born 24 September 1979) is a Bahraini former footballer who played as a goalkeeper for Bahrain in the 2004 AFC Asian Cup.

References

Living people
Bahraini footballers
Bahrain international footballers
Association football goalkeepers
1979 births
Footballers at the 2002 Asian Games
Asian Games competitors for Bahrain
2004 AFC Asian Cup players
Al-Ahli Club (Manama) players
Riffa SC players
Muscat Club players
Al-Seeb Club players